Seaboots, also known as sailing boots, are a type of waterproof boot designed for use on deck on board boats and ships in bad weather, to keep the legs dry, and to avoid slipping on the wet rolling deck. The most common fabrics are Gore-Tex and leather.

Unlike wellington boots, seaboots have non-marking, slip-resistant soles in order to avoid any damage to the vessel's deck. They are also thinner, and require thermal socks as the rubber does not provide enough warmth.

References

External links
 Image of some seaboots
 Historical advertisement

Sailing equipment
Boots